Robert Edward McChesney (July 12, 1912 – September 20, 1986) was an American football end in the National Football League for the Boston/Washington Redskins.  He played college football at the University of California, Los Angeles. He was selected to a Pro Bowl team on two occasions - in 1938 and in 1942. He was a member of the 1942 Redskins team that upset the undefeated Chicago Bears in the NFL Championship Game. Statistically, his best year as a pro was in 1941 when he had 19 receptions for 213 yards and 2 touchdowns.

References

External links

1912 births
1986 deaths
American football ends
Boston Redskins players
UCLA Bruins football players
Washington Redskins players
Players of American football from Los Angeles